Candice Davis Price (née Davis, born October 26, 1985) is an American hurdler. She won a gold medal over 100 metres hurdles at the 2007 NACAC Championships.

A native of Ann Arbor, Michigan, Candice attended Pioneer High School as a student during her adolescent years. She is married to American football player Brian Price.

References

External links

DyeStat profile for Candice Davis Price
USC Trojans bio

1985 births
Living people
Sportspeople from Ann Arbor, Michigan
American female sprinters
African-American female track and field athletes
USC Trojans women's track and field athletes
21st-century African-American sportspeople
21st-century African-American women
20th-century African-American people
20th-century African-American women